Do Bachche Dus Haath is a 1972 Bollywood drama film directed by Kalpataru Nasir. The film stars Ahmad Ansari and Prem Nath.

Music
"Bal Kha Ke Yun Tera Yeh Chalna" - Kishore Kumar
"Chal Laga Le Sootta Yeh Jag Jhoothha v1" - Asha Bhosle
"Chal Laga Le Sootta Yeh Jag Jhoothha v2" - Asha Bhosle
"Honth Gulaabi Kurta Laal Umar Hai Sola Satrah Saal" - Kishore Kumar
"Kaan Mein Jhumka (Parody Song)" - Mohammed Rafi
"Mar Gayi Main To Hai Rabba" - Asha Bhosle

External links
 

1972 films
Films scored by Sonik-Omi
1970s Hindi-language films
1972 drama films
Indian drama films
Hindi-language drama films